Danny Shone (born 22 May 1899) in West Derby, Liverpool, was an English association footballer who played as a striker for Liverpool in The Football League between 1921 and 1928. He was signed from local amateur side Grayson's of Garston in May 1921. In total he made 81 appearances for Liverpool and scored 26 goals.

Honours
Liverpool
English Champions: 1
1921–22

References 

1899 births
1974 deaths
People from West Derby
Footballers from Liverpool
English footballers
Liverpool F.C. players
West Ham United F.C. players
Coventry City F.C. players
English Football League players
Association football forwards